Sarah Jane Buxton (born July 3, 1980) is an American country music singer, formerly signed to the independent Lyric Street Records. Between 2006 and 2008, she issued three singles from an extended play titled Almost My Record, in addition to co-writing her song "Stupid Boy", which was later recorded by Keith Urban.  She released her self-titled debut album in early 2010, led off by the Top 25 single "Outside My Window," shortly before Lyric Street Records closed.

Biography
Buxton was born in Lawrence, Kansas. She became actively involved in music as a child by learning piano, playing flute and joining a children's choir. As she learned more about music, she became interested in songwriters and began writing poetry. After graduation, she met one of her musical idols, Stevie Nicks, who encouraged her to pursue music and move to Nashville, Tennessee.

Buxton enrolled at Nashville's Belmont University and started a Southern rock band called Stoik Oak, which toured the region for three years. After an 18-month engagement, she married Christopher Robin of the Christopher Robin Band when she was 22. However, they divorced shortly afterwards. She also felt discouraged about finding a place for her voice in the music business but found further encouragement from one of her friends, John Rich of Big & Rich. She asked her publisher to set up some co-writing sessions, and she became more confident in her approach to singing and songwriting. In the meantime, she sang background vocals for Kenny Rogers and John Corbett, in addition to singing duet vocals on Cowboy Troy's "If You Don't Wanna Love Me".

2006–2010: Lyric Street Records
"Stupid Boy", one of Buxton's songs, was covered by Keith Urban, on his mid-2006 album Love, Pain & the Whole Crazy Thing, taking his version to No. 3 on the country charts in 2007. Buxton sang backing vocals on the song "Tu Compañía" from the same album.

Buxton signed to Lyric Street Records that same year and released her debut single "Innocence", which peaked at number 31 on the country music charts. It was followed by "That Kind of Day", which reached number 26 in 2007. Both were included on a five-song digital extended play entitled Almost My Record, released only to digital retailers in mid-2007. 

Buxton released "Space", which she wrote with Lari White and Chuck Cannon, in October 2008. It peaked at number 38 in early 2009 and was added to Almost My Record. A fourth single, "Outside My Window", was issued in June 2009 and remained on the charts until February 2010, peaking at number 23. Buxton wrote this song with Victoria Shaw, Gary Burr, and Mark Hudson, who also directed the music video for it.

Buxton released her self-titled debut studio album on February 23, 2010. Produced by Buxton along with Craig Wiseman, Dann Huff, Bob DiPiero, and Blair Daly, the album includes all of her charting singles as well as her version of "Stupid Boy" and three duets with Jedd Hughes.

Lyric Street Records closed in April 2010 and Buxton was dropped from the label. Following the label's closure, she and Hughes formed a duo called Buxton Hughes. Less than a year after forming the duo, Buxton and Hughes parted ways.

2011–present
Urban recorded another one of Buxton's songs, "Put You in a Song", for the 2010 album Get Closer. Buxton also wrote Big & Rich's 2012 single "That's Why I Pray", Gary Allan's 2013 single "Pieces" from his album Set You Free, and The Band Perry's 2013 single "Don't Let Me Be Lonely" from their album Pioneer. In 2014, she co-wrote "PrizeFighter" by Trisha Yearwood and Kelly Clarkson, "Sun Daze" by Florida Georgia Line, and "Fix" and "For Her" by Chris Lane.

Buxton has co-written several songs that have appeared on the ABC hit TV show Nashville. Songs include ""Yellin' from the Rooftop", "Loving You is the Only Way to Fly", "Stronger Than Me", "Every Time I Fall in Love", and "Nothing in This World Will Ever Break My Heart Again", for which she and her co-writer Kate York received a Primetime Emmy Award nomination for Outstanding Original Music and Lyrics.

Musical styles
Stewart Mason of Allmusic wrote that Buxton has "an appealingly hoarse singing voice akin to Melissa Etheridge and a no-nonsense lyrical persona somewhat along the lines of Gretchen Wilson." Almost My Record received a positive review from Country Standard Time critic Michael Sudhalter, who said that "Stupid Boy" worked better from a female's perspective, and that "Innocence" was "one of the best songs about reminiscing of young love since Deana Carter's 'Strawberry Wine'." Jessica Phillips of Country Weekly magazine wrote in her review of the album that Buxton's lyrics cast her as "a typical 20-something-year-old girl in America."

Personal life
Buxton became engaged to session guitarist Tom Bukovac on December 20, 2009. They married on November 20, 2010. She gave birth to their first child, Marshall, on December 4, 2012. Their second son, Leo, was born in 2016.

According to Tom Bukovac, on March 29th 2021, he and Buxton ended their marriage of 10 years in 2020.

Discography

Studio albums

Extended plays

Singles

Guest singles

Other charted songs

Music videos

References 

1980 births
American acoustic guitarists
American women country singers
American country guitarists
American country singer-songwriters
American women singer-songwriters
Living people
Lyric Street Records artists
Musicians from Lawrence, Kansas
21st-century American women guitarists
21st-century American women singers
21st-century American singers
Singer-songwriters from Kansas